Leendert "Leen" Buis (5 December 1906 – 17 November 1986) was a Dutch road cyclist. He competed at the 1928 Summer Olympics and finished 17th individually and 9th in the team competition.

See also
 List of Dutch Olympic cyclists

References

External links
Leen Buis (photo)

1906 births
1986 deaths
Cyclists at the 1928 Summer Olympics
Dutch male cyclists
Olympic cyclists of the Netherlands
People from Haarlemmermeer
Cyclists from North Holland
20th-century Dutch people